This is a list of soccer clubs in the United States Virgin Islands.

 Central Link (St.Thomas)
 Chelsea (St.Croix)
 Free Will Baptist (St.Croix)
 Haitian Victory
 Helenites (St.Croix)
 Hess Oil Company (St.Croix)
 Laraza (St.Thomas)
 MI Roc Masters (St.Thomas)
 New Vibes (St.Thomas)
 Positive Vibes (St.Thomas)
 Prankton United (St.Croix)
 Raymix (St.Thomas)
 Rovers United (St.Croix)
 Saint John United SC (St.Thomas)
 Skills FC (St.Croix)
 Togetherness (St.Thomas)
 Unique FC (St.Croix)
 United We Stand SC (St.Thomas)
 Waitikubuli United SC (St.Thomas)

External links
RSSSF - US Virgin Islands - List of Champions

United States Virgin Islands
 
Soccer clubs
Soccer